The Otonabee Region Conservation Authority (ORCA), sometimes shortened to Otonabee Conservation, is a conservation authority in Ontario, Canada. Established in 1959 and based in Peterborough, its member municipalities include Asphodel-Norwood, Cavan-Monaghan, Douro-Dummer, City of Kawartha Lakes, Otonabee–South Monaghan, City of Peterborough, Selwyn, and Trent Hills. Major watercourses within the watershed administered by ORCA include the Otonabee, Indian, and Ouse rivers, and Baxter, Cavan, Jackson, Miller and Squirrel creeks.

Conservation Areas
Hope Mill
Imagine the Marsh
Jackson Creek Kiwanis Trail
Miller Creek Wildlife Area
Selwyn Beach Conservation Area
Squirrel Creek Otonabee-South Monaghan manages Squirrel Creek under an agreement with ORCA.
Warsaw Caves Conservation Area and Campground

In addition to the listed Conservation Areas, ORCA operates the campground area of Beavermead Park under agreement with the City of Peterborough.
Beavermead Campground

External links
Otonabee Conservation

Conservation authorities in Ontario
Organizations based in Peterborough, Ontario
Government agencies established in 1959
Water management authorities
1959 establishments in Ontario